AUST or Aust may refer to

Abbreviations
 Abbottabad University of Science and Technology in Khyber Pakhtunkhwa, Pakistan
 Ahsanullah University of Science and Technology in Dhaka, Bangladesh
 Ajman University of Science and Technology in Ajman, United Arab Emirates
 Anhui University of Science and Technology in Anhui Province, China
 Australia
 Austria

People
Aust (surname)

Places

in England 
Aust, a village in Gloucestershire, England
Aust Ferry
Aust Cliff
Aust Severn Powerline Crossing

in Norway
Aust-Agder, a county

See also
Augusta (disambiguation)